Yelena Tsukhlo (also transliterated as Alena Zuchlo; born 13 May 1954) is a Belarusian female former long-distance runner who competes in marathons.

Her first international success came at the World University Cross Country Championships, which she won in 1982. She later competed for Belarus at the 1994 IAAF World Cross Country Championships.

It was in the marathon she made her impact, however. In 1987 she set a personal best of 2:28:53 hours in Mogilev for second at the Soviet Championships, ranking her eighth on time for the season, then finished fifth at the 1987 World Championships in Athletics. She also competed at the 1982 European Athletics Championships, 1986 Goodwill Games, European Marathon Cup, IAAF World Marathon Cup (twice), and Friendship Games. She won numerous races on the professional circuit, foremost the 1985 Vienna City Marathon and three straight wins at the Warsaw Marathon from 1994 to 1996. Highly present on the Polish running scene, she is a six-time victor at both the Puck Marathon and Torun Marathon.

International competitions

Marathon wins
Gdansk Marathon: 1996, 1997
Lebork Marathon: 1997, 2001
Malorita Marathon: 2003
Puck Marathon: 1998, 1999, 2000, 2002, 2004, 2005
Szczytno Marathon: 1998, 2004, 2005
Torun Marathon: 1998, 2000, 2001, 2003, 2004, 2005
Tsukuba Marathon: 1993
Usedom Marathon: 1999, 2000, 2002, 2004
Uzhgorod Marathon: 1981, 1987
Vienna City Marathon: 1985
Warsaw Marathon: 1994, 1995, 1996

References

External links

Living people
1954 births
Belarusian female long-distance runners
Belarusian female marathon runners
Belarusian female cross country runners
Soviet female long-distance runners
Soviet female marathon runners
Soviet female cross country runners
World Athletics Championships athletes for the Soviet Union
Competitors at the 1986 Goodwill Games